Major General DeRosey Caroll Cabell (July 7, 1861 – March 15, 1924) was chief of staff for the Pancho Villa Expedition into Mexico in 1915–1916 and an American general during World War I.

Early life and education
DeRosey Caroll Cabell was born in Charleston, Arkansas on July 7, 1861.  He attended the United States Military Academy, graduating with the class of 1884. Other classmates included David C. Shanks, Samuel D. Sturgis, William L. Sibert, William Franklin Martin, Robert Houston Noble, Wilds P. Richardson, Eugene Frederick Ladd, Stephen Miller Foote, Everard Enos Hatch, Grote Hutcheson, all future general officers.

He attended the United States Army War College in 1913.

Career
Cabell received a commission as a second lieutenant for the 8th Cavalry on June 15, 1884. During his frontier duty, he participated in the Geronimo campaign and was wounded.

Later, he participated in the Great Sioux War of 1890 and 1891 and the China Relief Expedition of 1900. He served in the Philippines from 1900 to 1902.

He advanced through grades and was promoted to brigadier general on Dec. 17, 1917. He was promoted to major general on Oct. 1, 1918. After World War I, he returned to his regular rank of colonel.

Cabell was the commander of the Mexican Border Command until his retirement in 1919.

Awards
He received the Army Distinguished Service Medal for his service during the Pancho Villa Expedition. The citation for the medal reads:

Death and legacy
He retired to San Diego, California. He died there on March 15, 1924.

References

1861 births
1924 deaths
United States Army Cavalry Branch personnel
American military personnel of the Boxer Rebellion
United States Army personnel of the Indian Wars
Military personnel from Arkansas
United States Army generals of World War I
People from Charleston, Arkansas
United States Military Academy alumni
United States Army War College alumni
American military personnel of the Spanish–American War
American military personnel of the Philippine–American War
Recipients of the Distinguished Service Medal (US Army)
Burials at San Francisco National Cemetery
United States Army generals